Wayland Herman Becker (November 2, 1910 – December 1, 1984) was an American football player. He  played in the National Football League (NFL) for six seasons.

Early life
Becker was born in Soperton, Wisconsin, and attended East High School in Green Bay, Wisconsin. While in high school, he twice led his football team to Fox River Valley conference championships, in 1928 and 1929. Becker went on to attend Marquette University, where he played football and basketball, lettering twice.

Football career
Becker began his NFL career with the George Halas's Chicago Bears in 1934. He played just two games for the Bears before completing the 1934 season with the Brooklyn Dodgers, with whom he stayed through the 1935 season.

In 1936 Becker went to the Green Bay Packers, where he spent the next three seasons. Those Packers teams played in the NFL Championship Game twice during his tenure, winning in 1936 and losing in 1938.

He finished his NFL career in 1939 with the Pittsburgh Pirates. He was released by the Pirates after two games.

In 1941 he turned up on the Columbus Bullies of the American Football League. The team won the AFL championship and Becker was named by the league's coaches as second-team All-League based on his performance that season.

References

External links

1910 births
1984 deaths
American football defensive ends
American football wide receivers
Chicago Bears players
Brooklyn Dodgers (NFL) players
Green Bay Packers players
Pittsburgh Pirates (football) players
Columbus Bullies players
Marquette Golden Avalanche football players
Marquette Golden Eagles men's basketball players
People from Forest County, Wisconsin
People from Shawano County, Wisconsin
Players of American football from Wisconsin
People from Lena, Wisconsin
American men's basketball players
Green Bay East High School alumni